Cocaethylene (ethylbenzoylecgonine) is the ethyl ester of benzoylecgonine. It is structurally similar to cocaine, which is the methyl ester of benzoylecgonine. Cocaethylene is formed by the liver when cocaine and ethanol coexist in the blood. In 1885, cocaethylene was first synthesized (according to edition 13 of the Merck Index), and in 1979, cocaethylene's side effects were discovered.

Metabolic production from cocaine

Cocaethylene is the byproduct of concurrent consumption of alcohol and cocaine as metabolized by the liver. Normally, metabolism of cocaine produces two primarily biologically inactive metabolites—benzoylecgonine and ecgonine methyl ester. The hepatic enzyme carboxylesterase is an important part of cocaine's metabolism because it acts as a catalyst for the hydrolysis of cocaine in the liver, which produces these inactive metabolites. If ethanol is present during the metabolism of cocaine, a portion of the cocaine undergoes transesterification with ethanol, rather than undergoing hydrolysis with water, which results in the production of cocaethylene.

cocaine + H2O → benzoylecgonine + methanol (with liver carboxylesterase 1)
benzoylecgonine + ethanol → cocaethylene + H2O
cocaine + ethanol → cocaethylene + methanol (with liver carboxylesterase 1)

Physiological effects

Cocaethylene is largely considered a recreational drug in and of itself, with stimulant, euphoriant, anorectic, sympathomimetic, and local anesthetic properties. The monoamine neurotransmitters serotonin, norepinephrine, and dopamine play important roles in cocaethylene's action in the brain. Cocaethylene increases the levels of serotonergic, noradrenergic, and dopaminergic neurotransmission in the brain by inhibiting the action of the serotonin transporter, norepinephrine transporter, and dopamine transporter. These pharmacological properties make cocaethylene a serotonin-norepinephrine-dopamine reuptake inhibitor (SNDRI; also known as a "triple reuptake inhibitor").

In most users, cocaethylene produces euphoria and has a longer duration of action than cocaine. Some studies suggest that consuming alcohol in combination with cocaine may be more cardiotoxic than cocaine and "it also carries an 18 to 25 fold increase over cocaine alone in risk of immediate death". Cocaethylene has a higher affinity for the dopamine transporter than does cocaine, but has a lower affinity for the serotonin and norepinephrine transporters.

In McCance-Katz et alia's 1993 study cocaethylene "produced greater subjective ratings of 'High' in comparison with administration of cocaine or alcohol alone."

See also 
 Ethylphenidate
 Euphoriants
 Methylvanillylecgonine
 Local anesthetics
 Stimulants
 Tropanes
 Vin Mariani
 Pemberton's French Wine Coca

References

Further reading 

 Cocaethylene: responding to combined alcohol and cocaine use
 
 Warning of extra heart dangers from mixing cocaine and alcohol
 
 

Benzoate esters
Carboxylate esters
Tropanes
Euphoriants
Stimulants
Local anesthetics
Sympathomimetics
Cocaine
Serotonin–norepinephrine–dopamine reuptake inhibitors
Human drug metabolites